Eulatal is a former municipality in the Leipzig district, in Saxony, Germany. Since 1 January 2009, it is part of the town Frohburg.

See also 
Eula (river)

Former municipalities in Saxony
Leipzig (district)